Orchestrella is a genus of Namibian huntsman spiders that was first described by R. F. Lawrence in 1965.  it contains two species, found in Namibia: O. caroli and O. longipes.

See also
 List of Sparassidae species

References

Araneomorphae genera
Sparassidae